Rosebank is a cosmopolitan commercial and residential suburb to the north of central Johannesburg, South Africa. It is located in Region B of the City of Johannesburg Metropolitan Municipality, and is the location of a Gautrain station.

Rosebank has undergone a major face-lift in recent years, with the extensive redevelopment of both the Rosebank Mall and The Zone @Rosebank creating a high-end retail and shopping prescient. Local authorities also identified the node as a priority development area for improved service delivery and infrastructure. As a result, the suburb is estimated to have seen a R7 billion capital injection in recent years.

Rosebank is becoming an increasingly popular destination for corporates. Surging demand for office space has seen rentals in the suburb increase by 9% in the second quarter , the strongest growth recorded in any Johannesburg office node. Rentals in second-placed Fourways rose by only 3.4%, while in Sandton rentals increased by just 2.5% during the same period.

Its several high-end shopping malls make it a popular hangout and shopping destination for young professionals, celebrities, designers, and the gay community. Rosebank has a thriving nightlife with cafes, bars and clubs around the Design District such as Marble Restaurant, Molokai, Capital Cafe, The Bank, and Sumo Nightclub. The African Craft Market, and the popular Rooftop Market ("Rosebank Flea Market") are popular tourist destinations; various high-end hotels are also located in the suburb. The annual Joburg gay pride parade also passes through the streets of Rosebank, then heads to Zoo Lake.

Rosebank is often dubbed the new Sandton, an affluent neighborhood in the Gauteng Province and forms part of the City of Johannesburg Metropolitan Municipality which is located a mere  from Rosebank.

Economy
Rosebank is home to a WeWork and a number of corporate offices including Nu Metro Cinemas, Sasol, TotalEnergies (TOTAL House)  Bank of Taiwan, Car Track, Internet Solutions, State Bank of India, Standard Bank, Sappi, PepsiCo, BP, Coca-Cola SA, Anglo American plc , Universal Music Group  and Sony Music Entertainment.

The Zone @ Rosebank 
The Zone @ Rosebank shopping centre is an integrated mixed-use development in Rosebank, Johannesburg providing retail, office and hotel space in the highly frenetic environment of the pedestrian oriented Rosebank retail node.

The Zone comprises five separate buildings, namely The Zone, Regents Place, The Zone Phase 2, The Zone Boulevard and Cradock Square. The centre is located next to the newly refurbished adjoining and inter-leading Rosebank Mall. It is situated in the well established and fashionable Rosebank node within a high concentration of commercial points and the affluent surrounding suburbs of central Johannesburg and the Parks.

The Zone has set itself apart from other retail developments as the “fashionable favorite” depicting a diverse and relaxed environment for a multitude of cultures.

Hotels 
Rosebank is also home to a number of hotels including:

 The Jack Rose Hotel
 The Capital on Bath
 Radisson RED Rosebank
 Clico Boutique Hotel
 Holiday Inn
 IHG Hotels & Resorts- VOCO Rosebank
 Radisson Red
 The Courtyard Hotel Rosebank
 Tsogo Sun- 54 on Bath
 Tsogo Sun- Southern Sun Rosebank

Commercial property developments

The Bank 
The Bank is an exciting new mixed-use development in the hub of Rosebank, Johannesburg. The structure of the existing 4 storey building, previously a bank, is being retained and added onto. The ground floor consists of retail, restaurants and hotel reception and conference facilities. The other 11 floors are occupied by offices and IHG Hotels & Resorts Voco Hotel. The public areas around the building on the ground floor level will be activated through the design of pedestrian-friendly landscaping and furniture

The Rosebank Link 
This prestigious, 15 storey premium grade iconic building, comprising offices and retail space, has the perfect location opposite the Rosebank Gautrain station. With its unique design, it is certain to improve the Rosebank skyline. It is also in close proximity to various hotels, shopping centres and being on Oxford Road, it will also have excellent access to all forms of public transport. The building is aiming at achieving a four-star green rating and in addition, with two basement levels of parking and a five-level parkade, it will offer ample parking. Pedestrian walkways will connect this exciting building to adjoining buildings, such as the Rosebank Mall and The Zone.

Tenants include:

 Super Spar
 Seattle Coffee Company 
 WeWork

Rosebank Towers 
A premium-grade, multi-tenanted masterpiece office space overlooking Johannesburg and Rosebank's CBDs. The fourteen-storey building's faceted design and 4 Star Green Star rating bring a sense of peace and efficiency, in tune with the leafy green neighbourhood it towers over.

The Galleria 
A development of about  incorporating offices, retail, a hotel, serviced apartments and residential apartments.

The Firs 
Originally built in the 1970s, The Firs is an upmarket and niche retail centre situated in Johannesburg's northern suburb of Rosebank. Located adjacent to The Hyatt Regency Hotel, The Firs, which has over the years become a landmark in bustling and cosmopolitan Rosebank, underwent a multimillion-rand redevelopment. The completion of the 22 month-long redevelopment project in September 2009 saw the new and enhanced multi-use complex living up to its promise of unique experiences, including the magnificent triple-volume office lobby, a spectacular atrium which allows additional access from the basement parking, as well as a new and impressive restaurant piazza

Rosebank Fire Station 
The Rosebank Fire Station is one of the oldest buildings in Rosebank and is currently undergoing a transformation into a more useful space. The original building will stay in place, with add-on construction turning it into an office block.

Residential property developments 
The suburb also includes a wide range of luxury apartments, including:

 The Median
 The Tyrwhitt
 The Vantage
 Park Central
 The Monroe
 Tree Tops 
 100 Oxford
 Oxford Maine

References

Johannesburg Region B